Somalia competed at the 2009 World Championships in Athletics in Berlin from 15–23 August.

Team selection

Track and road events

References

External links
Official competition website

}

Nations at the 2009 World Championships in Athletics
World Championships in Athletics
Somalia at the World Championships in Athletics